Kevin Victor Kowalski (born January 2, 1989) is a former American football center in the National Football League for the Dallas Cowboys. He was signed by the Dallas Cowboys as an undrafted free agent in 2011. He played college football at the University of Toledo.

Early years
Kowalski attended Nordonia High School. As a senior, he was a two-way tackle, registering 75 tackles and 10 sacks, while contributing to an 8-1 record. He received first-team Division II All-Ohio honors and was invited to play in the Big 33 Football Classic.

He also practiced track, competing in the shot put and discus throw.

College career
Kowalski accepted a football scholarship from the University of Toledo. As a true freshman, he was a backup at right guard, contributing to the team ranking nationally first in total offense (448.4 yards-per-game) and rushing (209.2). The offense also ranked nationally second in
scoring (32.9 points-per-game) and tied for 19th in sacks allowed (16).

As a sophomore, he started all 12 games at right guard, as part of an offensive line that ranked 24th in the nation with 16 sacks allowed.

As a junior, he was switched to center and started all 12 games, contributing to an offense that ranked 16th in the nation
in total offense (437.9 yards-per-game) and 18th in passing offense (278.1 yards-per-game). As a senior, he started all 13 games center.

Professional career

Dallas Cowboys
Kowalski was signed as an undrafted free agent by the Dallas Cowboys after the 2011 NFL Draft on July 26. On September 18, he replaced an injured Phil Costa in the fourth quarter against the San Francisco 49ers, contributing to an overtime win. On October 16, he replaced an injured Bill Nagy against the New England Patriots. On December 11, against the New York Giants, he replaced an injured Phil Costa in the second quarter. On January 1, he replaced an injured Kyle Kosier against the New York Giants. He played mainly on special teams as a rookie.

He began the 2012 season on the Cowboys' physically unable to perform list with an ankle injury. He was activated on November 17 and was dressed for three games, but was also declared inactive in three others.

In the 2013 training camp, he was tried at offensive guard and fullback, but suffered a bruised knee in practice that limited his playing time. He was waived on August 31.

He now coaches the Coram Deo Lions.

Washington Redskins
On January 8, 2014, the Washington Redskins signed Kowalski to a futures contract. He was released on August 29.

References

External links
Toledo Rockets bio

1989 births
Living people
People from Bedford, Ohio
Players of American football from Ohio
American football centers
Toledo Rockets football players
Dallas Cowboys players